The Signing of Peace in the Hall of Mirrors, Versailles, 28 June 1919 is an oil-on-canvas painting by Irish artist William Orpen, completed in 1919. It was one of the paintings commissioned from Orpen to commemorate the Peace Conference at Versailles in 1919.  The work is held by the Imperial War Museum in London.

Background
Orpen was one of the first people chosen as a war artist by the British Ministry of Information in 1917. Orpen was also the official painter at the peace conference and was commissioned to paint three canvases to record the proceedings. The work was the most expensive of the British public art commissions associated with the First World War: Orpen was paid £3,000; by comparison, John Singer Sargent received £300 for his much larger painting Gassed.

The painting depicts the signature of the Treaty of Versailles by representatives from Germany on 28 June 1919 that formally ended the First World War. The group portrait depicts soldiers, diplomats and politicians who attended the conference while the treaty was signed in the opulent surroundings of Louis XIV's Hall of Mirrors at the Palace of Versailles. High up can be seen the words "Le Roy Gouverne par lui meme" (French: "The King governs alone"). It measures .

Orpen grew to dislike the politicians at the conference and considered them vain and greedy. In his painting, they are dwarfed by the scale of the palace.

Subjects
The people depicted are:

In the front row:
 Johannes Bell, German Centre Party politician, Reichskolonialminister (Minister of Colonial Affairs) and Reichsverkehrsminister (Minister of Transport), sitting in a chair, signing the treaty
 Hermann Müller, German SPD politician and Reichsaußenminister (Foreign Minister), stands beside him, leaning over

Seated in the middle row, from left to right:
 General Tasker H. Bliss, US Army officer and former Chief of Staff of the United States Army, in army uniform
 Edward M. House, US adviser to Woodrow Wilson
 Henry White, US diplomat and former US Ambassador to Italy and to France
 Robert Lansing, US Secretary of State
 Woodrow Wilson, President of the United States, holding papers
 Georges Clemenceau, Prime Minister of France
 David Lloyd George, British Prime Minister
 Bonar Law, British Lord Privy Seal (and later Prime Minister)
 Arthur Balfour, British Secretary of State for Foreign Affairs and former British Prime Minister
 Alfred Milner, 1st Viscount Milner, British Secretary of State for the Colonies
 George Barnes, British Minister Without Portfolio representing Organised Labour
 Marquis Saionji Kinmochi, genrō and former Prime Minister of Japan

Standing in the back row, from left to right
 Eleftherios Venizelos, Prime Minister of Greece
 Afonso Costa, former Prime Minister of Portugal
 Sir George Riddell, British journalist
 Sir George Foster, Canadian MP and delegate
 Nikola Pašić, former Prime Minister of Serbia and Prime Minister of Yugoslavia, with long white beard
 Stéphen Pichon, French Minister of Foreign Affairs, resting on a pillar
 Colonel Sir Maurice Hankey, British civil servant and first Cabinet Secretary, leaning over behind Clemenceau
 Edwin Montagu, British Secretary of State for India, behind the Maharajah of Bikaner
 Ganga Singh, Maharajah of Bikaner, from India, one of only two non-European members of the Imperial War Cabinet, leaning against a pillar
 Vittorio Emanuele Orlando, former Prime Minister of Italy
 Paul Hymans, Belgian Minister for Foreign Affairs
 General Louis Botha, Prime Minister of South Africa
 Billy Hughes, Prime Minister of Australia
 
Orpen is depicted twice, as an indistinct figure visible in the distorting mirrors behind the main subjects.

Other paintings
Orpen's other paintings of the conference depict preliminary discussions of the "Council of Ten" in the Hall of Clocks at the French Ministry of Foreign Affairs at the Quai d'Orsay, and another showing a coffin lying in state in a marble hall covered by a Union Flag.

External links
The Signing of Peace in the Hall of Mirrors, Versailles, 28th June 1919, Imperial War Museum
 Art from Different Fronts of World War One, Roger Tolson, BBC History
 A Peace Conference at the Quai d'Orsay, Imperial War Museum
Painting the Paris Peace Conference : William Orpen, 24 January 2009
The Treaty of Versailles, 1919: A Primary Source Examination of the Treaty that Ended World War I, Corona Brezina, The Rosen Publishing Group, 2005, p. 31
Breaking the Heart of the World: Woodrow Wilson and the Fight for the League of Nations, John Milton Cooper, Cambridge University Press, 2001, p. 412

1919 paintings
War paintings
Treaty of Versailles
Paintings in the collection of the Imperial War Museum
Paintings by William Orpen
Group portraits
Palace of Versailles
Portraits of politicians
Mirrors in art
Cultural depictions of Woodrow Wilson
Cultural depictions of David Lloyd George
Bonar Law
Eleftherios Venizelos